The 2000 Qatar Crown Prince Cup was the 6th edition of this cup tournament in men's football (soccer). It was played by the top 4 teams of the Q-League.

Al-Ittihad were crowned champions for the first time.

Results

Qatar Crown Prince Cup
1999–2000 in Qatari football